Jaik is a surname and given name. Notable people with this name include:

 Jaik Campbell (born 1973), British comedian
 Jaik Mickleburgh (born 1990), English cricketer
 Juhan Jaik (1899–1948), Estonian writer and journalist